Hope chest can refer to:

 Hope chest, a box containing items stored for a future marriage
 Hope Chest: The Fredonia Recordings 1982-1983, an album by 10,000 Maniacs
 The Hope Chest, a 1918 American film
 HopeChest, an American Christian young women's magazine
 Hopechest, a 1996 album by Stephanie Bentley
 Hope Chest, an American shoegaze / dream pop band from California formed in 1992